Prostanthera marifolia, commonly known as Seaforth mintbush, is a species of flowering plant that is endemic to a restricted area of New South Wales. It is a small, erect, openly branched shrub with egg-shaped to elliptic leaves, and purple to mauve flowers arranged in leaf axils.

Description

Taxonomy
Prostanthera marifolia was first formally described in 1810 by Robert Brown in Prodromus Florae Novae Hollandiae et Insulae Van Diemen, based on plant material collected on the north shore of Port Jackson.

Distribution and habitat
Seaforth mintbush is only known from the northern Sydney suburb of Seaforth where it grows on ridge-tops with Eucalyptus sieberi and Corymbia gummifera in or near the endangered Duffys Forest ecological community.

Conservation status
This mintbush was thought to be extinct, not having been collected since 1810, but was rediscovered in 2001 and subsequently classified as "critically endangered" under the Australian Government Environment Protection and Biodiversity Conservation Act 1999 and the New South Wales Government Biodiversity Conservation Act 2016. The main threats to the species are its small population size, habitat degradation from weed invasion, herbicide drift, stormwater runoff, rubbish dumping and trampling.

References

marifolia
Flora of New South Wales
Lamiales of Australia
Plants described in 1810
Taxa named by Robert Brown (botanist, born 1773)